The 1967 Bulgarian Cup Final was the 27th final of the Bulgarian Cup (in this period the tournament was named Cup of the Soviet Army), and was contested between Levski Sofia and Spartak Sofia on 16 July 1967 at Vasil Levski National Stadium in Sofia. Levski won the final 3–0.

Match

Details

See also
1966–67 A Group

References

Bulgarian Cup finals
PFC Levski Sofia matches
Cup Final